The Lake Erie Connector is a planned underwater electric transmission line that would run under Lake Erie to connect the power grids of the Canadian province of Ontario with the American state of Pennsylvania.

The connector is budgeted at US$1 billion.

Energy planners first started to work on the project in 2004.

References

External links
 

Lake Erie
HVDC transmission lines
Energy in Ontario
Energy in Pennsylvania
Proposed electric power infrastructure in North America
Fortis Inc.
Proposed electric power transmission systems